Bayonne Truck House No. 1, also known as Chief John T. Brennan Fire Museum, is located in Bayonne, Hudson County, New Jersey, United States. The firehouse was added to the National Register of Historic Places on January 2, 1976. The firehouse was constructed in 1875 to be used by Bayonne Hook and Ladder Company #1. The firehouse is now a museum known as the John T. Brennan Fire Museum.

See also
National Register of Historic Places listings in Hudson County, New Jersey
Exhibitions in Hudson County

References

External links

 John T. Brennan Fire Museum - Facebook site
 View of Bayonne Truck House No. 1 via Google Street View

Buildings and structures in Bayonne, New Jersey
Fire stations on the National Register of Historic Places in New Jersey
Buildings and structures in Hudson County, New Jersey
Fire stations completed in 1875
Government buildings completed in 1875
Museums in Hudson County, New Jersey
Defunct fire stations in New Jersey
Firefighting museums in the United States
National Register of Historic Places in Hudson County, New Jersey
New Jersey Register of Historic Places